XELFFS-AM is a radio station on 980 AM in Izúcar de Matamoros, Puebla. It is known as La Magnífica 980 AM.

History
XELFFS was awarded in the IFT-4 radio auction of 2017 for a winning bid of 133,000 pesos. The station signed on in late 2019 and was originally known as Mi Gente.

On February 1, 2021, the station affiliated with Tribuna Comunicación and installed its "La Magnífica" Regional Mexican format, used at XHZT-FM in the city of Puebla.

References

External links
La Magnifica 980 Facebook

Radio stations in Puebla
Radio stations established in 2019
2019 establishments in Mexico